Robert Specht (October 22, 1921 – January 11, 1999 in Palm Springs, CA) was an American figure skater who competed in pairs and men's singles.  He won the bronze medal in pairs with partner Joan Mitchell at the United States Figure Skating Championships in 1941 and captured the gold in men's singles the following year.  After serving in the Air Force during World War II, he skated for many years with the Ice Capades

Results
(men's singles)

(pairs with Mitchell)

References
   

American male pair skaters
American male single skaters
1921 births
1999 deaths
United States Army Air Forces personnel of World War II
20th-century American people